Todd Simonsen (December 10, 1959 – June 6, 2007) was an American football player and coach. He served as the head football coach at Upper Iowa University from 1986 to 1988, compilinga record of 5–24.  Simonsen played football at the University of Iowa, where he was a roommate of former University of Oklahoma head coach Bob Stoops.

Simonsen died on June 6, 2007, at Froedtert Hospital in Wauwatosa, Wisconsin, after suffering from lymphoma. He was a born-again Christian.

Head coaching record

References

External links
 

2007 deaths
American football linebackers
Iowa Hawkeyes football coaches
Iowa Hawkeyes football players
Upper Iowa Peacocks football coaches
High school football coaches in Wisconsin
People from Racine, Wisconsin
Players of American football from Wisconsin
Deaths from cancer in Wisconsin
Deaths from lymphoma
1959 births